In medieval Europe, attitudes toward homosexuality varied from region to region, determined by religious culture; the Catholic Church, which dominated the religious landscape, considered, and still considers, sodomy as a mortal sin and a "crime against nature". By the 11th century Sodomy was increasingly viewed as a serious moral crime and punishable by mutilation or death. Medieval records reflect this growing concern. The emergence of heretical groups, such as the Cathars and Waldensians, witnesses a rise in allegations of unnatural sexual conduct against such heretics as part of the war against heresy in Christendom. Accusations of Sodomy and unnatural acts were levelled against the Order of the Knights Templar in 1307 as part of Philip IV of France's attempt to suppress the order. These allegations have been dismissed by some scholars.

Theology 

Although homosexuality was not considered a major offense during the early Roman Empire, homosexual encounters and homosexual behavior came to be viewed as unacceptable as Christianity developed. The Old Testament (Leviticus 18:22, 20:13, Deuteronomy 22:5) condemned females who wore male attire, males who wore female attire, and males that engaged in homosexual intercourse. In the 11th century, the Doctor of the Church, St. Peter Damian, wrote the Liber Gomorrhianus, an extended attack on both homosexuality and masturbation. He portrayed homosexuality as a counter-rational force undermining morality, religion, and society itself, and in need of strong suppression lest it spread even and especially among clergy.

Hildegard of Bingen, born seven years after the death of St. Peter Damian, reported seeing visions and recorded them in Scivias (short for Scito vias Domini, "Know the Ways of the Lord"). In Book II Vision Six, she quotes God as condemning same-sex intercourse, including lesbianism; "a woman who takes up devilish ways and plays a male role in coupling with another woman is most vile in My sight, and so is she who subjects herself to such a one in this evil deed".

In the 13th century A.D., the theologian Thomas Aquinas was influential in linking condemnations of homosexuality with the idea of natural law, arguing that "special sins are against nature, as, for instance, those that run counter to the intercourse of male and female natural to animals, and so are peculiarly qualified as unnatural vices." This view points from the natural to the Divine, because (following Aristotle) he said all people seek happiness; but according to Aquinas, happiness can only finally be attained through the beatific vision. Therefore, all sins are also against the natural law. However, the natural law of many aspects of life is knowable apart from special revelation by examining the forms and purposes of those aspects. It is in this sense that Aquinas considered homosexuality unnatural, since it involves a kind of partner other than the kind to which the purpose of sexuality points. Indeed, he considered it second only to bestiality as an abuse of sexuality.

Greco-Roman secular views

In Mediterranean city states of the old world (ca. 40 B.C. to 400 A.D.), the norms by which a person carried out their private and public life were social and behavioral, rather than psychological or spiritual. Standards of human behavior were based on fulfillment of social expectations; for example, being a good citizen and bringing honor to one's family. It was considered one's duty to carry on the family line by marrying and raising children, regardless of sexual orientation.

For Roman citizens, marriage was a duty and was not meant for the purpose of fulfilling erotic needs. Therefore, it was considered normal for a male to look for sexual fulfillment outside marriage, though females did not have such liberty. Presumably, the main Greco-Roman moral view on human sexuality was that sexuality was good, as long as it did not interfere with a person's obligations to the state or family or involve the abuse of free children or married women.  Other views stated that sexuality was dangerous and should be limited. People that held such beliefs would usually commit themselves to celibacy or limit their sexual activities either to marriage, or strictly for the purpose of procreation. Such views, though, did not preclude homosexual acts; they simply aimed to reduce promiscuous heterosexual activity.

Sexual orientation in Roman society was neither a questioned nor a judged matter. How a person expressed their sexuality was based and limited to class, age, and marital status rather than gender. Although there were a few exceptions, the higher a person's social status, the more limits a person would have. This included limitations on sexual acts and fewer sexual partners. For example, a high status male could penetrate another person, male or female, without damage to his social status; but for him to be penetrated by any person could possibly result in a loss of status. On the other hand, a slave's social status, or that of any other free male of a similar class status, would not be affected by any sexual act as long as the intercourse did not happen with another person the slave's owner allowed him to, or as long as it did not happen with an adult male citizen.

Penetration and power were highly correlated with the rights of the ruling elite in Roman society. It was acceptable for members of the less powerful group to surrender to penetration by members of a more powerful group.  Thus, penetration was associated with a man's power and authority, and was not regarded as either a homosexual or heterosexual act.  Although some scholars disagree, there is evidence that shows that lesbianism was not viewed as a problem; there were no laws restricting it. The Romans, perhaps because they were such a male-centered society, wrote little in their historical literature about women, especially lesbians.

Early Christian medieval views
Around 400 A.D., Christianity began to introduce a new sexual code focused on the religious concepts of holiness and "purity." The emerging Church, which gained social and political sway by the mid-third century, had two approaches to sexuality. One of these, like their Greco-Roman predecessors, did not view or judge sexuality in terms of heterosexual or homosexual acts. Instead, it only judged the act itself, and promoted a sex life that mainly focused on platonic relationships.  Some point to the ancient Church's Brother-Making Ceremony as an example of same-sex marriage, but this is contested. For instance, the Roman tradition of forming a legal union with another male by declaring a "brother" persisted during the early Medieval years. Also, though there was no official marriage within religious communities, long lasting relationships or bonds were made. Also, there are many poems from that century that suggest the existence of lesbian relationships. 
 
The main approach to Christian sexuality held an opposing view. Under this approach, sex was only meant for procreation purposes. Sexual activity in which procreation was impossible, including homosexual acts, was considered sinful. Such a view was inherited from aspects of late antique pagan ethics and was at first limited to abstinent Christian writers who were deeply inspired by Hellenistic philosophy. Eventually, it would be this approach to sexuality that was favored and spread throughout the Christian world because it limited sexual activity the most and appealed to an already understood principle. Ultimately, this approach would become the standard of Catholic orthodoxy.

Punishment in medieval times

By the end of the Middle Ages, most of the Catholic churchmen and states accepted and lived with the belief that sexual behavior was, according to Natural Law aimed at procreation, considering purely sterile sexual acts, i.e. oral and anal sex, as well as masturbation, sinful. However homosexual acts held a special place as crimes against Natural Law. Most civil law codes had punishments for such "unnatural acts," especially in regions which were heavily influenced by the Church's teachings.

In early Medieval years, homosexuality was given no particular penance; it was viewed like all the other sins. For example, during the eighth century, Pope Gregory III gave penances of 160 days for unnatural female acts and usually one year for males who committed acts of sodomy, the passive partner being treated more severely. During the Inquisition itself, individuals were rarely investigated for sodomy alone; it was usually associated with the expression of heretical beliefs and attacks on the Church. Those who did not recant their heresy would be severely punished.

The Papal restoratio of the 11th century led to increasingly harsher attitudes towards Sodomites. The Council of Nablus in 1120, in the Kingdom of Jerusalem, enacted severe penalties for Sodomy in the aftermath of the defeat of the Antiochene army at the Field of Blood the year before. In thirteenth century France Sodomy resulted in castration on the first offense, dismemberment on the second, and burning on the third. Lesbian ( a term never used in the Middle Ages) behavior was punished with specific mutilations for the first two offenses and burning on the third as well. By the mid-fourteenth century in many cities of Italy, civil laws against Sodomy were common. If a person was found to have committed sodomy, the city's government was entitled to confiscate the offender's property.

By 1533, King Henry VIII had enacted the death penalty for sodomy, which became the basis for many anti-sodomy laws to establish the death penalty The Buggery Act 1533.  This also led to the fact that although the Renaissance traced its origins to ancient Greece, none of the literary masters dared to publicly proclaim "males' love".

Art 
In the subject of homosexuality in medieval Europe, art is one of the least studied aspects when researching the matter. As Constantine legalized Christianity in the fourth century, the religion became widespread through medieval Europe over the centuries leading to less secular subjects to be produced as more energy was used to convert practitioners of pagan religions. This was also in part because from the early to late middle ages most art was produced under the church, leading art of the time to have more theological themes. Though this was the case depictions of homosexuality as sodomy did exist varying in form from region to region, either in forms of damnation by the church or depictions of love mainly through manuscripts and literature.

Literature and Poetry 
One of the earliest documented mentions of medieval sodomy comes from the 10th century. From poet German Roswitha of Gandersheim/Hrotsvitha there exist the Passio S. Pelagic, in which homosexuality as sodomy is dictated a practice of foreign lands, Arabic to be precise. Within its content, championed was the Christian protagonist, Pelaguis, for sticking to his faith against pursuits of the caliph of Cordoba, Abderrahmann, denying his embrace and becoming a martyr. Anglo-Saxon literature of this time exist as well, such as De Lantfrido et Cobbone, a Latin work corroborating the idea of homosexuality/sodomy as a pagan and pre-Christian ideals and also one of the first depictions of bisexuality within literature.

Placed within the poetry of the 11th and 12th century of the medieval world laid a contradiction to the damnation of homoeroticism of the church. As Latin was pushed into practice in the French realm, the poetry produced in this time had elements of homosexuality and Christianity. Most notable of this genre are the works of three bishops, Marbodius of Rennes, Baudri of Bourgueil and Hildebert of Lavardin. 

These are notable works due to the position of the three men as they were men of the church, bishops to be specific. Marbod's work as it has been studied has been found to have the most homoerotic and explicit themes, though he has been found on record denying such accusation citing his writing as more metaphorical

The depiction of homosexuality in art saw a rise in the Late Middle Ages, beginning with the Renaissance of the twelfth century, when Latin and Greek influences were revitalized in Europe. Influenced by Roman depictions of homoerotic love, these "neo-Latin" poets portrayed male love in a positive light, while avoiding explicitly mentioning homosexuality, which was still a taboo topic. An example is the poet Marbodius of Rennes, who wrote of male beauty and desire:

Poetry about homosexual acts in medieval Europe was not very widespread. One piece of writing that did describe homosexual acts was "Le Livre des Manières". Written by Étienne de Fougères between 1173 and 1178, his poems contrast the "beauty" of heterosexual sex to the "vile", unnatural homosexual sex. Seven of the stanzas focus specifically on lesbian sex acts:

"They do their jousting act in couples
and go at it full tilt;
at the game of thigh-fencing
they lewdly share their expenses.

They're not all from the same mold:
one lies still and the other makes busy,
one plays the cock and the other the hen
and each one plays her role“.

Noteworthy here, according to Sahar Amer, is that every stanza seems to decry the lack of a penis; Robert Clark Aldo notes “the ever-present but always absent phallus”. Amer also notes that the author may well have leaned on Arab treatises about sexuality, for metaphors and specific words pertaining to lesbian sexual activity.

Illuminated Manuscripts 

As more depictions of sodomy became prevalent, there came about a form of writing that interlaced the writing of homosexual love and biblical texts. These became known as “moralized” texts. This form of writing was typically accompanied by illuminated manuscripts, which lead to them to be more costly and also just as rare. Typically commissioned by someone of royal status, they existed as a reinventing of ancient literary text of the bible and Greek literature. Within this they are translated and the context is reinvented to fit the morals of Christianity in the thirteenth and fourteenth century[. The most famous of these being the “Bible Moralisée” which features manuscript illustrations in circles to show which moral it stands for.  Paired with this was the “Ovide Moralisée”, used to change feelings against previous pagan literature. With this in mind typically works within them that portrayed homosexual love where then reinvented to instead condemn the happening inside of the manuscript. Within the "Ovide Moralisée", a text on Jupiter and Ganymede is instead used to condemn sodomy, though its actual meaning was to show the story of Ganymede becoming the cup bearer of the gods

Lesbianism

Background
Sexuality in the Middle Ages was male-centered and revolved around the idea that a man's penis was required to have fulfilling sexual activity. The lack of attention paid to lesbianism in the Middle Ages can stem from this belief, that as long as a dildo or other penis-shaped object was not used in lesbian relationships, then the relationship was not considered fully sexual.

Religious
Many of the writings that deal with lesbianism in medieval Europe come from religious texts. The earliest text that shows the Church's disapproval of lesbianism comes from the writings of St. Paul to the Romans. In his letters, he states:
"women exchanged natural relations for unnatural, and the men likewise gave up natural relations with women and were consumed with passion for one another…and receiving in their own persons the due penalty for their error."

While Paul does not explicitly describe lesbian relations between women, he does state that this is an unholy choice made and that women who commit these "unnatural" acts will be punished, presumably by God's will. This is one of the earliest descriptions of lesbianism that details how early Church leaders felt about what were described as "unnatural" relations. The mentality of the church regarding lesbianism was also seen in the rise of penitentials. Penitentials were guides used by religious leaders and laypersons in dealing with issues in a broader community. While discussion of dealing with lesbianism was not mentioned in these penitentials, it was an overall concept that lesbian relations was a smaller sin than male homosexuality.

One such penitential that mentions the consequences for lesbian activity was the Paenitentiale Theodori, attributed to Theodore of Tarsus (the eighth Archbishop of Canterbury). There are three main canons that are mentioned in regards to female homosexuality:
12. If a woman practices vice with a woman, she shall do penance for three years. 
13. If she practices solitary vice, she shall do penance for the same period.
14. The penance of a widow and of a girl is the same. She who has a husband deserves a greater penalty if she commits fornication.

According to his canons, Theodore sees lesbian activities as a minor sin, as fornication is considered, rather than a more serious sexual sin like adultery. Unmarried women and girls were judged less severely because they had a single status and did not have another form of sexual release. Married women, who had willing sexual partners in their husbands, were judged more harshly because they sought sexual satisfaction through an "unnatural" form.  Religious figures throughout the twelfth and thirteenth centuries continued to ignore the concept of lesbianism but in St. Thomas Aquinas' Summa Theologiae discusses in his subject of lust that female homosexuality falls under one of the four categories of unnatural acts.

Medicine and science
There were two medical situations that were linked to lesbianism in medieval Europe. Once such condition was that the womb of a woman had a buildup of her seed and due to lack of sexual intercourse, this cause the suffocation of the womb. The cure for this suffocation was for a midwife to place hot items on the woman and bring her to orgasm.  This would help her to retain the seed of a man. The idea of one woman bringing another woman to orgasm was considered morally wrong by religious leaders and in the thirteenth century, it was urged that marriage was a solution for this problem rather than manual stimulation. The second ailment was ragadia of the womb, in which fleshy growths grew as a result of intercourse or childbirth and these growths could sometimes grow on the outside of the vagina. These growths resembled penises and it was thought that women with these would be able to have heterosexual sex with other women because a penis was needed to have intercourse. Eventually the practice of masturbating women and the idea that women with the ragadiae would have sex with other women disappeared over time, further masking lesbian activities in medieval Europe.

Secular laws
Laws against lesbianism in medieval Europe were not as mainstreamed as laws for male homosexuality. While not as serious, lesbianism still posed a threat to male-centered social order. It was often ignored in secular law but there is one known exception. Written around 1260, the French legal treatise Li Livres de jostice et de plet prescribed that if convicted of sodomy: "The woman who does this shall undergo mutilation (on the first and second) offense and on her third must be burnt." This is one of the only laws that has been known to specify what the consequences were for women who engaged in lesbian sexual activity. By the thirteenth century, lesbianism was equated to sodomy and therefore carried a similar sentence. However, secular courts did not prosecute cases of lesbianism, mainly because laws that would cause it to be brought to court barely existed.

Art

A single courtly love poem exists, written by one Bieiris de Romans and addressed to another woman named Mary, which several scholars have argued is in fact expressing homosexual female love.  The issue is heavily debated in scholarship, however, as nothing else is known about Bieiris (Beatrice) other than the poem itself.  Some scholars argue that she was writing on behalf of a man, others that she was simply playing with the format and using the same register of affectionate language common in everyday society at the time:  the poem never mentions "kissing" Mary but only praising her character, making it unclear if the "love" that Beatrice was expressing was romantic or platonic.  A counter-argument made by other scholarship is that the very fact Beatrice chose to use a poetic format so traditionally used to express romantic love means she must have known it would be understood as expressing a romantic context.

References

Further reading

 Amer, Sahar. Crossing Borders: Love Between Women in Medieval French and Arabic Literatures. Philadelphia: University of Pennsylvania Press, 2008.
 Bailey, Derrick Sherwin. Homosexuality and the Western Christian Tradition. London: Longmans, Green & Co., 1955.
 Boswell, John. Christianity, Social Tolerance and Homosexuality: Gay People in Western Europe from the Beginning of the Christian Era to the Fourteenth Century Chicago: University of Chicago Press, 1980; 2015. 
 Boswell, John. Same-Sex Unions in Premodern Europe. FontanaPress, 1994. 
 Burgwinkle, William E. Sodomy, Masculinity, and Law in Medieval Literature: France and England, 1050–1230. Cambridge: Cambridge University Press, 2004.
 Cadden, Joan. Nothing Natural is Shameful: Sodomy and Science in Late Medieval Europe. Philadelphia: University of Pennsylvania Press, 2013.
 Clark, David. Between Medieval Men: Male Friendship and Desire in Early Medieval English Literature. Oxford: Oxford University Press, 2009.
 Cook, Matt, with Robert Mills, Randolph Trumbach, and H. G. Cocks. A Gay History of Britain: Love and Sex Between Men Since the Middle Ages. Oxford: Greenwood, 2007. 
 Crompton, Louis. Homosexuality and Civilization. Cambridge, MA: Harvard University Press, 2003.
 Diem, Albrecht. ‘Teaching Sodomy in a Carolingian Monastery: A Study of Walahfrid Strabo’s and Heito’s Visio Wettini’, in: German History 34 (2016), pp. 385-401.
 Dinshaw, Carolyn. Getting Medieval: Sexualities and Communities, Pre- and Postmodern. Durham, NC: Duke University Press, 1999.
 Evans, Ruth, ed. A Cultural History of Sexuality in the Middle Ages. Oxford: Berg, 2011.
 Goodich, Michael. The Unmentionable Vice: Homosexuality in the Later Medieval Period. Santa Barbara: ABC-Clio, 1979.
 Hergemöller, Bernd-Ulrich. Sodom and Gomorrah: On the Everyday Reality and Persecution of Homosexuals in the Middle Ages. Translated by John Philips. London: Free Association Books, 2001.
 Jordan, Mark. The Invention of Sodomy in Christian Theology. Chicago: University of Chicago Press, 1997.
 Karras, Ruth Mazo. Sexuality in Medieval Europe: Doing Unto Others. New York: Routledge, 2005.
 Keiser, Elizabeth B. Courtly Desire and Medieval Homophobia: The Legitimation of Sexual Pleasure in “Cleanness” and Its Contexts. New Haven, CT: Yale University Press, 1997.
 Kłosowska, Anna. Queer Love in the Middle Ages. New York: Palgrave Macmillan, 2005.
 Mills, Robert. Seeing Sodomy in the Middle Ages. Chicago: University of Chicago Press, 2015. 
 Olsen, Glenn W. Of Sodomites, Effeminates, Hermaphrodites, and Androgynes: Sodomy in the Age of Peter Damian. Toronto: Pontifical Institute of Mediaeval Studies, 2011.
 Puff, Helmut. Sodomy in Reformation Germany and Switzerland, 1400–1600. Chicago: University of Chicago Press, 2003.

LGBT and Christianity